The 1978 Individual Ice Speedway World Championship was the 13th edition of the World Championship  The Championship was held on 4/5 March 1978 in Assen in the Netherlands.

The winner was Sergey Tarabanko of the Soviet Union for the fourth successive year.

Classification

See also 
 1978 Individual Speedway World Championship in classic speedway

References 

Ice speedway competitions
Ice